Michael Schmuhl is an American political figure serving as the chair of the Indiana Democratic Party. Schmuhl previously managed the Pete Buttigieg 2020 presidential campaign. Schmuhl worked for more than a year as Buttigieg's chief of staff during Buttigieg's South Bend, Indiana mayoralty. Schmuhl has also been involved in the business sector.

Early life and education
Schmuhl was born and raised in South Bend, Indiana. His father is Robert Schmuhl, an emeritus professor of American Studies at the University of Notre Dame. Schmuhl went to high school at St. Joseph High School, where he befriended a young Pete Buttigieg. Their fathers were also friends, both working as professors at Notre Dame.

He graduated from University of Notre Dame in 2005 with a bachelor's degree in history. His uncle William Schmuhl, has also taught at the university. He later received a master's degree in international affairs from the Paris Institute of Political Studies.

Career
In 2004, Schmuhl was an intern at Meet the Press with Tim Russert at NBC News in Washington, D.C. He then worked at The Washington Post, where he was a producer and booker in the newsroom.

He returned to Indiana in 2009 and managed Joe Donnelly's 2010 successful congressional reelection campaign.

Schmuhl reconnected with his high school friend Pete Buttigieg, and managed his 2011 campaign for Mayor of South Bend, Indiana.

In October 2011, after Butch Morgan resigned from his role as Democratic chairman for Indiana's 2nd congressional district, Schmuhl agreed to run for the position. He was elected by county chairs and vice chairs from the counties in the district in November.

When Buttigieg assumed the office of mayor in January 2012, he named Schmuhl as his chief of staff. Schmuhl stepped down from this position in May 2013. He resigned from the job in order to pursue a master's degree at Sciences Po in Paris, France.

He returned to the United States in 2015 and began working at the Democratic consulting firm 270 Strategies in Chicago.

Schmuhl advised Indiana congressional candidates Shelli Yoder and Mel Hall in 2016 and 2018, respectively, and he also served as treasurer of Buttigieg's hybrid PAC, Hitting Home PAC. 

Schmuhl was campaign manager for Buttigieg's 2020 presidential campaign. Pete for America was the largest political campaign in Indiana history. Buttigieg became the first openly LGBTQ person to win presidential primary delegates and the first openly LGBTQ person to become a Senate-confirmed Cabinet secretary in American history.

After Buttigieg's campaign, Schmuhl began working at Heartland Ventures, a small venture capital firm located in South Bend. Schmuhl and a business partner also acquired Joe's Tavern, a historic bar in South Bend.

In 2021, Schmuhl successfully ran to succeed  John Zody as chairman of the Indiana Democratic Party. On March 20, 2021, Schmuhl won the vote by the state central committee to be the state party chair, electing him to a four-year term as state party chairman. In addition, Myla Eldridge, who Schmuhl had chosen as his running mate, was elected by the state central committee to the position of state party vice chair in a separate vote. As chair, Schmuhl has received media attention for working to revive the Democratic Party in Indiana through a series of tours and for working to combat Republican misinformation and disinformation.

Schmuhl joined LangleyCyber, a cybersecurity firm, as principal in October 2021.

See also
Mayor Pete (film)

References

21st-century American politicians
American campaign managers
Indiana Democrats
Pete Buttigieg
Politicians from South Bend, Indiana
Sciences Po alumni
State political party chairs of Indiana
University of Notre Dame alumni